WNDY (91.3 FM), is a college radio station in Crawfordsville, Indiana, owned and operated by Wabash College. The station simulcasts the Indianapolis NPR station WFYI-FM.

The station is not related to the similarly called television station, WNDY-TV in Indianapolis, which is owned by Circle City Broadcasting.

References

External links
 WFYI official website
 WNDY website (archived from September 2005)
 

WNDY (FM)
Wabash College
NDY
NDY
Radio stations established in 1997
1997 establishments in Indiana
Crawfordsville, Indiana